Theodore Langhans Taylor (June 23, 1921 – October 26, 2006) was an American author of more than 50 fiction and non-fiction books for young adult readers, including The Cay, The Weirdo (winner of the 1992 Edgar Award for Best Young Adult Mystery), Timothy of the Cay, and The Bomb.

Taylor died on October 26, 2006, in Laguna Beach, California, from complications of a heart attack.

Early life
Taylor was born in Stateville, North Carolina where he lived until he was 10. He then resided in Craddock, North Carolina. He dropped out of high school at age 17 and began writing for a living.

Career
During World War II Taylor served in the United States Merchant Marines. He served in the United States Navy during World War II.

Taylor worked as a press agent connected with the American film industry and wrote on the side. Early in his career he wrote fiction and non-fiction works aimed at adults. It was not until The Cay he started writing works aimed at youths.

Notable works

The Cay

The Cay, Taylor's story of a racially prejudiced white boy stranded with a black man, has become perhaps the most beloved of his young adult novels. It took only three weeks to complete and has seen worldwide sales of around four million. Taylor based the character of the boy in his book on a childhood friend, named Phillip. "The one thing I remembered about [him] was that his mother had taught him to hate black people and to hate them with a passion," Taylor once told a reporter from the Los Angeles Times. In the book, the boy sheds his racist views as he learns to admire and respect the black man who had rescued him from the ocean, especially after he goes blind. For a short period of time The Cay was banned and was classified as racist.

Timothy of the Cay

In 1993, Taylor wrote and published the follow-up to The Cay, which he titled Timothy of the Cay. It describes the life of Timothy before his encounter with Phillip Enright, the narrator of The Cay, and what happened to Phillip after he was rescued, by which time Timothy had been dead for almost two months.

Other works
Another work by Taylor, The Maldonado Miracle was adapted into a film starring Salma Hayek.

Another work by Taylor, “Rogue Wave”, an adventure story.

References

External links

 
"Theodore Taylor, 85; wrote 'The Cay' and other novels for the young", Jocelyn Stewart, The Los Angeles Times, October 28, 2006
 

1921 births
2006 deaths
American children's writers
American male novelists
People from Statesville, North Carolina
Novelists from North Carolina
20th-century American novelists
21st-century American novelists
Edgar Award winners
20th-century American male writers
21st-century American male writers
United States Merchant Mariners of World War II
United States Navy personnel of the Korean War